Abandon Kansas is the sixth studio EP by the American Christian rock band Abandon Kansas.  It is the second EP released on Gotee Records.  The EP was released digitally on February 8, 2011 as a free download on Amazon.com.

Track listing

References

External links
 

2011 EPs
Abandon Kansas albums
Gotee Records EPs
Christian rock EPs